Disturbing Behavior is a 1998 teen science fiction psychological horror film starring James Marsden, Katie Holmes, and Nick Stahl. The film was directed by David Nutter, who was a director and producer on The X-Files, and the screenplay was written by Scott Rosenberg. The plot follows a group of high school outcasts who discover their seemingly perfect "Blue Ribbon" classmates are part of an elaborate mind control experiment.

The film, which contains nods to 1975 thriller The Stepford Wives, premiered on July 24, 1998 and received negative reviews. The film went through numerous studio-mandated cuts from MGM prior to theatrical release in response to negative test screenings. There has been considerable fan support for the release of a director's cut version that restores deleted scenes.

Plot

High school senior Steve Clark is new to Cradle Bay, a picturesque island community in Washington state's Puget Sound. His family has moved from Chicago after the suicide of eldest son Allen, a loss that continues to haunt Steve. On his first day at the local high school, Steve befriends three outcast students: Gavin Strick, U.V., and Rachel Wagner. Steve is also introduced to school psychologist Dr. Edgar Caldicott, who is aware of Steve’s loss and suggests he make new friends by joining a program called the Blue Ribbons, which is described as a “motivational workshop.”

The Blue Ribbons are a clique of preppy, clean-cut overachievers who organize bake sales and car washes. Members attempt to recruit Steve into their fold, but Gavin, who is viewed with contempt by the clique, steers him away. Gavin claims they are a murderous cult that has been “hypnotized, lobotomized and brainwashed” by Caldicott and that the whole town is in on it, but Steve thinks Gavin is exaggerating.

Outside a store where Gavin tries to score alcohol, Rachel is approached by Chug, a jock Blue Ribbon member with a thing for her. After catching sight of Rachel in her midriff-baring outfit, Chug suddenly snaps into a rage and starts savagely beating up a guy inside the store. Chug nearly kills him while the town’s police chief, Officer Cox, simply looks on. When Steve asks his new friends what just happened, Rachel says it must be 'roid rage. Gavin insists again on his mind control theory, producing photos of his former burnout friends who were “reprogrammed” into Blue Ribbons.

Gavin takes Steve to a school hideout where they eavesdrop on a PTA meeting presided over by Caldicott. During the meeting, Gavin learns his parents volunteered him for Caldicott’s program. A fearful Gavin brandishes a gun that he plans to use on potential abductors, but Steve calls him paranoid and wrestles the gun away from him. The following day, Gavin shows up to school as a clean-cut Blue Ribbon, with his long hair now cut short, his grungy clothing replaced by a preppy style, and his friendship with Rachel and U.V. coldly tossed aside.

Steve's attempts to reach Gavin are met with hostility from other Blue Ribbons. He is beaten up by the clique, with Gavin landing the final blow. When Steve returns home, he finds Blue Ribbon member Lorna in his living room, having just tutored his younger sister Lindsay. Lorna attempts to seduce him, but in her arousal she flies into a violent rage as her right eye glows red. Repeating the words “wrong, bad”, she smashes a wall mirror with her head and attacks Steve with a shard, but he subdues her and she snaps out of her episode, acting as if nothing happened.

Meanwhile, Steve befriends Mr. Newberry, the school janitor who also harbors suspicions about the Blue Ribbons. He demonstrates a device to Steve that emits a soft, high-pitched whine intended to repel rats. Later, Rachel is cornered in the boiler room by Chug in an attempted rape, but Newberry’s rat-catching device goes off and sends Chug into a frenzy. Rachel escapes and Chug finds the device, destroying it. Newberry, having witnessed the incident, realizes the device acts as an irritant on Blue Ribbons.

In search of answers, Steve and Rachel venture to Bishop Flats, a nearby mental hospital. Their investigation confirms Gavin’s theory about the Blue Ribbons and mind control: Caldicott is implanting brain microchips on Cradle Bay teenagers with the approval of their parents, who want to reprogram their kids from juvenile delinquents into well-behaved model citizens. However, Caldicott could not turn off the teenagers’ hormones, resulting in momentary violent fits whenever the subjects’ sexual urges act up. Steve and Rachel attempt to get Lindsay so they can flee town, but they are ambushed by Caldicott and Steve’s parents, who reveal the reason the family moved to Cradle Bay was to sign Steve up for the program. Multiple Blue Ribbons capture Steve and Rachel, and Steve wakes up at the programming place. Steve is strapped into a chair and a technician prepares to reprogram him, but Steve gets hold of a scalpel and frees himself and Rachel.

On their way out, they encounter Chug, but Rachel is able to strike him with a pipe, killing him. Rescued by Lindsay and U.V. in Rachel’s truck, they rush to catch an outgoing ferry but run into a roadblock where a horde of Blue Ribbons—Caldicott amongst them—is assembled. Newberry suddenly drives up in his car and activates the multiple rat-catching devices strapped to his vehicle, scrambling the mind control tech inside the Blue Ribbons’ heads and sending them maniacally chasing after him.

While U.V., Lindsay, and Rachel head for the ferry, Steve follows Newberry on a motorcycle. Newberry, fatally wounded by a gunshot from Caldicott and with multiple Blue Ribbons swarming him, drives his car off of a cliff, taking most of the Ribbons down with him. Steve encounters Caldicott and the two fight, ending with the doctor being pushed off the cliff. Steve rides the motorcycle to the ferry and reunites with Rachel in a kiss. The four teens leave Cradle Bay to begin a new life without their parents.

A final scene cuts to a classroom in an inner-city high school where kids are playing loud music and acting rowdily. A principal walks in the room to introduce a new student teacher. The teacher turns around to face the students and reveals his identity—a survived Gavin, still programmed with the Blue Ribbon technology.

Cast

Production 
An international co-production between Australia, The United States and Canada. Scott Rosenberg's script for Disturbing Behavior was acquired by MGM in August 1997, with Beacon Pictures signing on to produce. James Marsden was cast in December of that year.

Principal photography occurred from January 1998 to late March in the Vancouver area.

Studio cuts 
The film underwent numerous studio-mandated recuts and a reshoot of the original ending due to negative test screenings. Many of the cuts were to scenes providing plot and character development. After the first test audience screening, Nutter cut the backstory for Steve’s brother Allen as well as a love scene between Steve and Rachel, but when the film again tested below studios’ expectations, MGM proceeded to take full control of the film and hired another editor, George Folsey, Jr., to make further cuts. Nutter was instructed to shoot a new ending in which the character of Gavin survives, as test audiences had disliked the plot line where Gavin dies. Cuts made to the film were so severe that Nutter considered having his name removed from the credits, but decided not to out of respect for his cast and crew.

Director David Nutter said he envisioned the film as an atmospheric X-Files-style thriller, but the studio wanted a Scream-style teen horror. He commented, “Their attitude was ‘Let’s just get to the fright beats.' They felt teenagers wouldn’t sit through a picture that was more than 90 minutes.”

The studio ultimately cut 31 minutes' worth of film from Nutter's 115-minute version, resulting in an 84-minute theatrical cut.

Reception
On Rotten Tomatoes the film has a 33% rating based on reviews from 39 critics.
Audiences polled by CinemaScore gave it a grade C-.

Negative reviews cited the film's derivative feel, with many claiming it appeared to take well-worn tropes from other horror and science-fiction films like The Stepford Wives, A Clockwork Orange, and Village of the Damned. Stephen Holden of The New York Times said the film "could have worked as an eerie fable about teen-age identity and social stratification in the age of Prozac" but descends into "a paint-by-numbers creep show that can't muster enough energy to be the tiniest bit scary." Multiple reviews said the film lacked in scares.

Positive reviews praised parts of the dialogue, particularly the cafeteria scene where the different school cliques are introduced. The performance of Nick Stahl as rebel outsider Gavin was also cited as being one of the film's highlights. Lisa Schwarzbaum of Entertainment Weekly wrote, "But for all its influences, Disturbing Behavior establishes a semi-real, semi-supernatural, part-mocking, part-commiserating genre of its own—a state so precarious that those expecting chillier frights or warmer laughs may be disappointed."

Other reviews noted a lack of coherence in the story and unevenness in tone. Sight & Sound wrote “Ultimately, the same schizophrenic impulse pervades the entire film: it's too pompous to be camp, but too silly to be genuinely engaging.”

Box office 
The film opened at No. 7 at the North American box office making $7 million USD in its opening weekend. It had a 57% decline in earnings the following week, falling to No. 12.

Home media 
According to an interview with Fangoria, David Nutter was close to getting a director's cut release on DVD, but MGM prevented him from finishing the restoration. In 2000, MGM released Disturbing Behavior on DVD. Included are a director's audio commentary in addition to eleven deleted scenes not seen in the theatrical version, which includes the original ending where Gavin meets a different fate than the one used in the theatrical release. The deleted scenes exist as an extra feature and are not reinserted into the film.

A Blu-ray version which carries over existing extras was released by Shout! Factory on March 22, 2016. This version of the film has subsequently gone out of print. The film was eventually re-released on Blu-Ray through the MVD Rewind Collection on October 11, 2022. This version again carries over existing extras from the original DVD release.

Alternate versions 
The United States cable networks Syfy Universal and Comet (TV network) have been known to air a somewhat unofficial director's cut of the film, with the deleted scenes reinstated, although the film is still shown with the theatrical ending.

Although a director's cut was never released, there has been online circulation of fan edit versions which use the DVD's deleted scenes including the film's original ending.

Retrospective 
A 2019 review for Gizmodo noted the film "really wants to offer a youthful new twist on some classic sci-fi themes [and] had the potential to be something more." Cinapse also stated, "In spite of all the hacking the studio inflicted upon Disturbing Behavior, many of the filmmakers’ core themes of high school life in the late ’90s manage to shine through. The film does indeed speak to teen conformity, the pressures to fit in amongst peers and to live up to parental expectations."

Soundtrack

The soundtrack for the film was released July 28, 1998 and features 12 songs from the genres of alternative rock and post-grunge.
 
The music video for the song "Got You (Where I Want You)” by The Flys contains scenes from the film and features Katie Holmes and James Marsden. Not included in the soundtrack is the song “Flagpole Sitta” by Harvey Danger, which can be heard in the film’s mental hospital scene and was used in trailers and TV spots for the film. A soundtrack of the film's score composed by Mark Snow was also released.

 “Every Little Thing Counts" – Janus Stark
 "Got You (Where I Want You)" – The Flys
 “Hole In My Soul" – Hutt
 “Monster Side" – Addict
 “Hello" – Once Upon A Time
 “Blown" – F.O.S.
 “Million Rappers" – Phunk Junkeez
 “Sometimes" – Driver
 “Drivertime Radio" – Eva Trout
 “Ever She Flows" – Treble Charger
 “Psycho Clogs" – Jack Drag
 “Hail Mary” – Skold

See also
 The Stepford Wives
 The Stepford Children
 Strange Behavior

References

External links

 
 Disturbing Behavior at AllMovie
 

1998 films
1998 horror films
1998 science fiction films
1990s English-language films
1990s psychological thriller films
1990s science fiction horror films
1990s teen horror films
American high school films
American psychological thriller films
American psychological horror films
American science fiction horror films
American teen horror films
Australian science fiction horror films
Australian science fiction thriller films
Beacon Pictures films
Canadian science fiction horror films
Canadian science fiction thriller films
Films directed by David Nutter
Films produced by Armyan Bernstein
Films scored by Mark Snow
Films set in Washington (state)
Films shot in British Columbia
Films with screenplays by Scott Rosenberg
Mad scientist films
Metro-Goldwyn-Mayer films
Films about mind control
1990s American films
1990s Canadian films